A widespread, destructive tornado outbreak affected Iowa, Kansas, Missouri, and Nebraska on April 27, 2002 and Illinois, Indiana, Kentucky, Maryland, New York, Ohio, Pennsylvania, Tennessee, Virginia, and West Virginia on the following day, April 28. Generally, tornado reports were widely scattered in each state, but significant to severe damage was noted in multiple states. Overall, 48 tornadoes were confirmed along with 6 deaths, 256 injuries, and $224 million in damage, with wind and hail adding to the damage total.

Meteorological synopsis
On April 25, the Storm Prediction Center first noted the potential for organized severe weather across the lower Missouri River Valley as an upper-level trough ejected eastward across the United States. The organization delineated a Moderate risk across most of Missouri, portions of Illinois, western Kentucky, western Tennessee, and northern Arkansas the following day. On the morning of April 27, forecasters noted a coupled jet stream across the country, with a  250 mb jet over James Bay and a  jet over Oklahoma. In response to this favorable configuration, potent 850 mb winds of  overspread Missouri, enhancing the northward progression of moisture. Within this warm air advection regime, several clusters of elevated atmospheric convection developed throughout the morning hours coincident with steep mid-level lapse rates—values representing the change in temperature with height—of 7.5 C/km, mainly posing a risk for marginally severe hail as they moved across Kansas, Missouri, Iowa, and Illinois. Within hours, sunshine enveloped portions of central Kansas, where thunderstorms were expected to develop along the dryline stretching southward into central Texas. In this area, a moist and unstable environment materialized, but long and straight hodographs—plots showing the change in wind with height—favored a predominant large hail and damaging wind threat from any discrete activity before it congealed into a squall line overnight.

Farther north in southern Nebraska and Iowa, a greater tornado threat was expected to evolve along the warm front and east of the surface low, where wind shear and barometric pressure falls were most conducive for supercell thunderstorms capable of producing strong—F2 or greater on the Fujita scale—tornadoes. By the afternoon, widespread thunderstorm activity began to develop near the intersection of the dryline and warm front across northeastern Kansas, northwestern Missouri, and southwestern Iowa. Several weak tornadoes occurred in this region over ensuing hours. After sunset, the greatest risk for severe weather shifted across Missouri and eastward across several states into Ohio. The SPC noted that the isolated nature of supercells precluded the issuance of a High risk. Discrete or embedded supercells moved across Missouri, Illinois, Tennessee, and Kentucky during the pre-dawn hours, where wind shear remained very favorable for tornadoes given low-level storm relative helicity in excess of 500 m2/s2. Numerous tornadoes were confirmed, many of which were significant. By sunrise, the formation of several bow echoes suggested a transition to a greater damaging wind event.

During the morning of April 28, the SPC again outlined a Moderate risk of severe weather, this time stretching from Ohio eastward across much of the Mid-Atlantic. While a line of pre-frontal convection was ongoing during the early morning hours, this activity was expected to weaken as it encountered stable air across the Appalachian Mountains. Meanwhile, with a sharp cold front moving eastward across portions of the Ohio and Tennessee valleys, and into Pennsylvania as well, a severe squall line was expected to take shape and pose a risk for widespread damaging winds, severe hail, and one or two tornadoes. Across the Delmarva region, forecasters expected 1,000–2,000 J/kg of CAPE to develop amid a lee trough despite lingering clouds and precipitation. With large-scale forcing focused north of Virginia, only scattered thunderstorms were expected in this region, though the environment favored the potential for supercells. Into the afternoon hours, one particular supercell developed in central West Virginia and progressed eastward across Virginia, producing its first strong tornado in Shenandoah County. While much of this region had been located in stable air north of a warm front through the morning, that boundary lifted north after midday and allowed for rapid destabilization. Thus, as the supercell continued east across Virginia and Maryland, it notably produced a historic F4 tornado in La Plata, Maryland. Additional damaging tornadoes accompanied the storm until it moved offshore after sunset.

Confirmed tornadoes

See also
[[List of North American tornadoes and tornado outbreaks]

Notes

References

External links
Satellite imagery (University of Wisconsin–Madison)

F4 tornadoes by date
Tornadoes of 2002
Tornadoes in Illinois
Tornadoes in Indiana
Tornadoes in Iowa
Tornadoes in Kansas
Tornadoes in Kentucky
Tornadoes in Maryland
Tornadoes in Missouri
Tornadoes in Nebraska
Tornadoes in New York (state)
Tornadoes in Ohio
Tornadoes in Pennsylvania
Tornadoes in Tennessee
Tornadoes in Virginia
Tornadoes in West Virginia
April 2002 tornado outbreak
Natural disasters in New York (state)
Natural disasters in Kentucky
Tornado outbreak 2002-04-27